Mary FitzRoy, Duchess of Richmond and Somerset (1519 – 7 December 1557), born Lady Mary Howard, was the only daughter-in-law of King Henry VIII of England, being the wife of his only acknowledged illegitimate son, Henry FitzRoy, 1st Duke of Richmond and Somerset.

Biography

Lady Mary Howard was the second daughter of Thomas Howard, 3rd Duke of Norfolk: a member of the ambitious Howard Family. At the time of her birth, her father was the second-most senior noble in the English peerage; her maternal grandfather Edward Stafford, 3rd Duke of Buckingham, the most senior. After Buckingham's execution in 1521, her father was one of only two dukes in the Kingdom, (the other being Charles Brandon, 1st Duke of Suffolk). This changed in 1525, when Henry VIII elevated Henry FitzRoy, his six-year-old illegitimate son by Elizabeth Blount, to the Dukedom of Richmond and Somerset.  When in 1529 Thomas Wolsey, who was charged with FitzRoy's care, fell from grace the mantle passed to Thomas Howard. At the same time the idea arose, allegedly from either the King or Anne Boleyn, that FitzRoy should marry Howard's daughter.

Four years later, in November 1533, negotiations were completed and Howard, now aged thirteen or fourteen, and FitzRoy, himself just fourteen, were married. Through her father, she was first cousin to both Anne Boleyn and Catherine Howard, as well as second cousin to Jane Seymour.

The match was a triumph for the Boleyn family as the Duchess was a former member of Queen Anne's household, and a staunch advocate of reform. It was also a very advantageous match for the Duchess as with no legitimate male heir to the throne, the Duke was seen at the time as a likely future king. However, the marriage was not to last as FitzRoy died of consumption within three years. He had barely turned seventeen.

Fearful that sexual activity too early was unhealthy, the King had ordered the couple not to consummate their marriage. As a result, the Duchess was not allowed to keep many of the lands which would normally have been her entitlement as widow: the King insisted without the consummation, it was not a true marriage. She remained at court, closely associated with the King's niece, Margaret Douglas. Together they were the main contributors to the Devonshire Manuscript, a collection of poetry from themselves and court poets. The duchess is thought to be the owner or holder of the manuscript; it is not known how much she contributed, however she is thought to have copied in one of her brother's poems "O Happy Dames." In 1539, Douglas and the Duchess were appointed to meet Anne of Cleves at Calais.

When Catherine Howard fell from grace, the Duchess and her entire family were arrested and briefly imprisoned in the Tower of London. In both 1538 and 1546 her father petitioned for her to be married to Thomas Seymour. The King gave his approval for the match, but her brother, Henry, Earl of Surrey, objected strongly, as did the Duchess herself; and the marriage did not take place. Surrey then suggested that the Duchess should seduce the aged King, her father-in-law, and become his mistress, to "wield as much influence on him as Madame d'Etampes doth about the French King". The Duchess, outraged, said she would "cut her own throat" rather than "consent to such villainy". She and her brother fell out, and she later laid testimony against Surrey that helped lead to his trial and execution for treason.

Sympathetic to the Reformation, after her brother's death in January 1547, she engaged John Foxe as tutor for his children.

The Duchess never remarried and her presence at court dwindled not long after Henry VIII died in January 1547. She died in late 1557, during the reign of her half-sister-in-law, Queen Mary I.

Further reading
 Beverley A. Murphy's Bastard Prince: Henry VIII's Lost Son
 Kelly Hart's The Mistresses of Henry VIII
 Henry VIII's Last Victim: The Life and Times of Henry Howard, Earl of Surrey by Jessie Childs
 Henry Howard, the Poet Earl of Surrey: A Life by W.A. Sessions

Fictional portrayals
Though the Duchess has not been portrayed in any film or television program thus far, she was mentioned in the second episode of the 2021 miniseries Anne Boleyn in a scene between Anne and her uncle Thomas Howard where they discuss his daughter's marriage to Henry FitzRoy that has not yet been consummated.

She has appeared in many books of noted historical fiction, most notably The Secrets of the Tudor Court by Darcey Bonnette which features Mary as the main character, and The Sixth Wife, in which she is a rival of Catherine Parr, and is used by her brother Surrey to try to become a "seventh wife" of the King despite her protests. As in history's account, her character mainly falls into the background toward the end of the novel after the king has died. She is also featured in Queen's Gambit, a novel about Catherine Parr and is featured as one of Catherine's rivals. Mary was also the main character and story-teller in Brazen by Katherine Longshore.

References

External links
 A portrait of the Duchess titled "Lady of Richmond" was sketched by Hans Holbein

1519 births
1557 deaths
English duchesses by marriage
Mary FitzRoy, Duchess of Richmond and Somerset
Daughters of English dukes
16th-century English women
16th-century English nobility